Rhytidoporus compactus is a species of burrowing bug in the family Cydnidae. It is found in Central America and North America.

References

Cydnidae
Articles created by Qbugbot
Insects described in 1877
Hemiptera of Central America
Hemiptera of North America